Re Gray’s Inn Construction Co Ltd [1980] 1 WLR 711 is a leading UK insolvency law case, concerning the cessation of transactions without court approval after a winding up petition.

Facts
Gray’s Inn Construction Co Ltd was a building business, which did a number of small jobs. When one of its creditors, Field-Davis Ltd presented a petition, it was ordered to be wound up by the court. Between the petition date and the court order date, its bank, Natwest (Tavistock Square branch) allowed it to operate its account. It traded unprofitably.

Judgment
Buckley LJ declined to validate most of the transactions and gave guidance on when they would or would not be void. He held that all transactions in and out of the bank account were ‘dispositions’ within the Insolvency Act 1986 section 127 (at the time, CA 1948 s 227). The court should validate transactions to ensure that unsecured creditors will not be prejudiced, applications for specific transactions have to show proof there will be no prejudice, and the more speculative a transaction is, the more unlikely it should be approved. Applications to court need not be made if there is a need for speedy action and the beneficial character of the bargain is obvious. Sales of assets for full market value raise no concern.

Buckley LJ's judgment read as follows.

Goff LJ and Sir David Cairns concurred.

Comment

See also

UK insolvency law
Coutts & Co v Stock [2000] 1 WLR 906
Hollicourt (Contracts) Ltd v Bank of Ireland [2000] EWCA Civ 263, [2001] Ch 555, [2001] 1 BCLC 233

Notes

References

United Kingdom insolvency case law
Court of Appeal (England and Wales) cases
1980 in case law
1980 in British law